Bronn may refer to:
 Gwenn Teir Bronn, figure in Welsh mythology
 Heinrich Georg Bronn (1800-1862), German geologist and paleontologist
 Bronn (character), character in the epic fantasy novels A Song of Ice and Fire and the television series Game of Thrones based upon it
 Broons (by Breton name), town and commune in France

See also
 Bron (disambiguation)